Calal Kengerli or Jalal Kengerli (born  6 July  1992) is an Azerbaijani film director, music video director, television commercial director and photographer. He has written and directed music videos for many prominent artists including the Murad Arif, Röya, Tunzale, Zulfiyya Khanbabayeva, Abbas Baghirov, Zamig Huseynov and Safura Alizadeh.

Biography
Calal Kengerli was born on July 6, 1992 in Baku. He studied at school No. 190. In 2013, he graduated from Azerbaijan State Economic University. He has been working in various fields of art since 2010. 

In 2014, he organised an individual exhibition named "Moments of life" in Azerbaijan State University of Culture and Arts.

Calal Kengerli mainly works as a wedding photographer. But also he is in cooperation with famous azerbaijani artists as a music video director. Calal Kengerli is author of social responsibility campaigns such as "I'm different", "As kind as her name" dedicated to children with autism. and "Everything will be fine" dedicated to deaf culture. He is also author of "Letter to father", a short film dedicated to the 25th anniversary of the Khojaly massacre.

He won Luxury Award for "Fashion designer of the year" nomination in 2017.

He got married in 2017  and father of two.

Projects

Music videos
 Murad Arif - İnşallah (2015) 

 Elchin Jafarov - Sözüm ona (2016) 

 Elchin Jafarov - İlk & son (2016) 

 Emil Badalov - Həyat yoldaşım (2017) 

 Ramal Israfilov - Gizli aşiqlər (2017) 

 Murad Arif - Partlat (2017) 

 Elmar Yunis - Cəhənnəm (2018) 

 Tunzale ft. Khayyam Nisanov - Səninlə mən (2019)

 Abbas Baghirov - Sevgilim (2020) 

 Abbas Baghirov, Zulfiyya Khanbabayeva, Tunzale, Khayyam Nisanov - Шуша возвращается домой (2020) 

 Zamig Huseynov - Son nəfəsimizə qədər (2021) 

 Tunzale - Mənim əsgər sevgilim (2021) 

 Röya - Sənə qədər (2021) 

 Tunzale - Yol açıqdır (2021) 

 Safura Alizadeh - Ağla (2021)

Short films
 Savior
 Letter to father (2017) 
 (2020)
 (2021)

Social responsibility campaigns
 I'm different (2016) 

 Everything will be fine (2018) 

 The voice of Karabakh (2020) 

  As kind as her name (2021)

References

External links

1992 births
Living people
Music video directors
Azerbaijani photographers
Commercial photographers
People from Baku
Television commercial directors